WHOU-FM (100.1 FM) is a radio station broadcasting a classic hits format. Licensed to Houlton, Maine, United States, the station serves the Southern Aroostook County area, as well as Northern Penobscot and Northern Washington Counties, along with Western New Brunswick, Canada.  The station is currently owned by Northern Maine Media and features programming from ABC Radio. The WHOU calls were also used on former sister station AM 1340.

On May 24, 2018, WHOU-FM changed their format from adult contemporary to classic hits.

Current programming
A majority of WHOU's programming features new music from the Top 100 charts, along with a local morning show, afternoon request show, Boston Red Sox baseball, and local high school basketball.

References

External links

HOU-FM
Classic hits radio stations in the United States
Mass media in Aroostook County, Maine
Radio stations established in 1956
Houlton, Maine
1976 establishments in Maine